was a Japanese former Nippon Professional Baseball first baseman. He both batted and threw right-handed.

Iida spent most of his 16-year career with the Nankai Hawks, where he won 5 Best Nine Awards, 4 Pacific League pennants, and a Pacific League MVP Award in 1955. He spent the remainder of his career with the Kokutestu Swallows, with his final season in 1963. He played 1,246 consecutive games until finally taking a rest day on May 24, 1958.

Early life 
Iida was born in Yokohama and played baseball at Asano High School. He did not go to college.

Playing career

Nankai Hawks 

Iida began his professional career with the Nankai Hawks of the Japanese Baseball League in 1947. He found success relatively quickly, leading the team in hits in 1949, and winning 4 consecutive Best Nine Awards from 1950 through 1953. He led the league in RBIs in 1951. In 1955, he was both a Best Nine Award winner and a Pacific League MVP. He was also chosen as the leading hitter of the Japan Series after hitting two home runs. In 1956, he played 154 games, setting an NPB record, which is shared with Kohei Sugayama and Shinya Sazaki. With the Hawks, Kazuto Tsuruoka, Chusuke Kizuka, Kazuo Kageyama, and Iida all made up what was known as the Million Dollar Infield, with Tsuruoka and Iida becoming Hall of Famers, Kizuka a six-time All-Star, and Kageyama a Rookie of the Year award winner.

Kokutestu Swallows 
Iida went to the Swallows of Kokotestu for the 1957 season. As a Swallow, he ended his 1,246-game long streak of playing on May 24, 1958. He ranked second in the league in total hits in 1957, and 5th in 1959. By 1960, he was out of the top 10, and by 1963, he was out of the league.

Managerial career and death 
Iida became the 8th manager of the Swallows, then-called the Atoms, in 1966, being replaced by Takehiko Bessho in 1968 after 3 consecutive losing seasons. Soon after, in 1969, he was appointed manager of the Hawks, being replaced with Katsuya Nomura the next year, following a 50-76-4 campaign, finishing last in the Pacific League. His NPB managerial record was 224-292-18.

Iida died on June 19, 2000, at the age of 76.

References 

1924 births
2000 deaths
Baseball people from Kanagawa Prefecture
Japanese baseball players
Nippon Professional Baseball infielders
Nankai Hawks players
Kokutetsu Swallows players
Nippon Professional Baseball MVP Award winners
Managers of baseball teams in Japan
Tokyo Yakult Swallows managers
Fukuoka SoftBank Hawks managers
Japanese Baseball Hall of Fame inductees